The Cook Islands national under-20 football team is the national U-20 team of the Cook Islands and is controlled by the Cook Islands Football Association. With a population of around 24,000 people it remains one of the smallest FIFA teams.

History
Cook Islands have only won two games so far. A 2–0 win awarded against Samoa in 2001 and a 5–0 win against American Samoa in 2016.

Competition Record

OFC
The OFC Under 20 Qualifying Tournament is a tournament held once every two years to decide the qualification spots for Oceania Football Confederation (OFC) and representatives at the FIFA U-20 World Cup.

Current squad
The following players were called up for the 2022 OFC U-19 Championship from 7 to 20 September 2022. Names in italics denote players who have been capped for the Senior team.

Caps and goals as of 14 September 2022 after the game against American Samoa.

2018 squad
The following players were called up for the 2018 OFC U-19 Championship from 26 May to 2 June 2018. Names in italics denote players who have been capped for the Senior team.

Caps and goals as of 2 June 2018 after the game against American Samoa.

Squad for the 2016 OFC U-20 Championship

Caps and goals as of 10 September 2016 after the game against Tahiti.

Fixtures and results

2016

2018

List of coaches
  Tuka Tisam (-2016)
  Matt Calcott (2016-2017)
  Alan Taylor (2018-)

See also
 Cook Islands men's national football team
 Cook Islands men's national under-17 football team
 Cook Islands women's national football team
 Cook Islands women's national under-17 football team

References

External links
Cook Islands Football Federation official website

U
Oceanian national under-20 association football teams